Francis Hurdon (June 18, 1834 – December 19, 1914) was an Ontario businessman and political figure. He represented Bruce South in the 1st Canadian Parliament as a Conservative member.

He was born in Camelford, Cornwall, England in 1834, the son of James Hurdon, and educated at Wadebridge. He was a grain merchant in Kincardine and served on the town council there.

In 1857, Hurdon married Charlotte S. Chubb. He died in Toronto at the age of 80.

References 

1834 births
1914 deaths
Conservative Party of Canada (1867–1942) MPs
Members of the House of Commons of Canada from Ontario
People from Camelford
British emigrants to Canada